Archilestris is a genus of robber flies in the family Asilidae. There are about six described species in Archilestris.

Species
These six species belong to the genus Archilestris:
 Archilestris excellens Enderlein, 1914 c g
 Archilestris gapopterus (Wiedemann, 1828) c g
 Archilestris geijskesi Papavero & Bernardi, 1974 c g
 Archilestris longipes (Macquart, 1838) c
 Archilestris magnificus (Walker, 1854) i c g b
 Archilestris wenzeli Papavero & Bernardi, 1974 c g
Data sources: i = ITIS, c = Catalogue of Life, g = GBIF, b = Bugguide.net

References

Further reading

 
 
 

Asilidae
Articles created by Qbugbot
Asilidae genera